The 2017 NCAA Women's Gymnastics Championships were held April 14–15, 2017, at the Chaifetz Arena in St. Louis, Missouri.

NCAA Championship (Super Six)
The Super Six finals were held on April 15. Oklahoma scored an NCAA championship record 198.3875 to win their second consecutive national title. The Sooners had the highest team scores on vault, uneven bars, and floor exercise. They were led by Maggie Nichols, who had the highest score of the day on vault and tied for the highest scores on balance beam, with a 10, and floor exercise.

Standings
1. Oklahoma - 198.3875

2. LSU - 197.7375

3. Florida - 197.7000

4. UCLA - 197.2625

5. Utah - 196.5875

6. Alabama - 196.0000

Individual results

All-around

Event champions

Vault

Uneven bars

Balance beam

Floor exercise

References

NCAA Women's Gymnastics championship
2017 in American sports
NCAA Women's Gymnastics Championship
2017 in women's gymnastics